Alfonso III may refer to:

Alfonso III of Asturias (866–910), surnamed "the Great"
Afonso III of Portugal (1210–1279)
Alfonso III of Aragon (1285–1291)
Alfonso III d'Este, Duke of Modena and Reggio (1628–1644)
Alfonso III of Kongo (1666–1667)